Sweet 75 was a band formed by Krist Novoselic in 1994 after the break-up of Nirvana. The band released one self-titled album before splitting up in 2000.

History
Krist Novoselic formed Sweet 75 after Nirvana's 1994 break-up, along with Venezuelan-born street singer Yva Las Vegass, whom he met after his wife hired her to sing at his birthday party. Novoselic originally planned to produce an album for the singer but after writing songs together, they decided to form Sweet 75, the name taken from a poem by Theodore Roethke. With Bobi Lore added on drums, they performed a few live shows in 1995 and signed to Geffen Records. In 1996 a bootleg of a November 17, 1995 live show was released by the record company Sea Monkey called Trucked Up Fuckstop. Lore was replaced by former Ministry drummer Bill Rieflin before the band recorded their self-titled debut album, which included guest performances from Peter Buck of R.E.M., Anisa Romero (of Sky Cries Mary), and Herb Alpert. The album was not released until 1997, after a tour with Dinosaur Jr., by which time Rieflin had been replaced by former Shudder to Think drummer Adam Wade, and failed to make much impression, either commercially or critically. The album was described as blending "indie-rock with heavy rock, Mexican music, lounge and country". In addition, a single of the song "Lay Me Down" was released in Australia. It contained the album tracks "Lay Me Down" and "La Vida", and a previously unreleased song called "Soap Zone". Wade left in October 1997, and the group disbanded in early 1998. They reformed later that year, with Rieflin back on drums, and recorded demos for a second album, but Novoselic and Rieflin began spending more time on their other project, Sunshine Cake, with Anisa Romero, and in mid-1999 the band again split up. Further work on the second album in 2000 was reported but by August that year the band had split up for good, citing "creative differences". According to the memoirs of a former roommate and friend of Yva Las Vegass, Jupiter Davidson, the break-up was due to Yva's perception that Krist was "racist", although the same claim had been falsely made by her about him as well.

Band members
 Krist Novoselic – guitar, bass, accordion
 Yva Las Vegass – bass, vocals
 Bobi Lore – drums
 Bill Rieflin – drums
 Adam Wade – drums
 Gina Mainwal – drums

Discography

Albums
Sweet 75 (1997), DGC

Singles
"Lay Me Down" (1997)

References

External links
Krist Novoselic's Sweet 75 web page

American alternative rock groups
Musical groups established in 1994
Musical groups disestablished in 2000
DGC Records artists
1994 establishments in the United States